Ali al-Jerbi (1903–1969) was a Libyan politician. He was the first defence minister of Libya after independence.

Personal life
Jerbi was born in Derna, Libya. In 1911 he studied in Turkey, then part of the Ottoman empire. He lived in Istanbul until 1923, when he returned and worked as a teacher. He died in April 1969.

Career

Before independence 
He held the post of Minister of Transport of Cyrenaica emirate  from September 1949 – July 1950. He then entered the interim government (headed by Mahmud al-Muntasir), where he served as Foreign minister (March–December 1951), Health minister (March–April 1951) and Justice minister (April–December 1951).

Defence minister 
He became minister for defence in the first cabinet formed after independence from December 1951 to February 1954.
He'd aimed during his term to establish the Libyan Army from the surviving members of the Senussi force, who fought with the western allies in World War II. He gave recruits military scholarships to Iraq and Turkey for military training, established  the military academy in Benghazi.

Ambassador 
He became the Libyan ambassador to Turkey and non-resident ambassador in Iraq from 1954 to 1961. He became ambassador to France 1961–1967.

Notes

People from Derna, Libya
1903 births
1969 deaths
Ambassadors of Libya to Turkey
Ambassadors of Libya to France
Defence ministers of Libya
Libyan expatriates in the Ottoman Empire